The Drogheda Steam Packet Company was founded in 1826 as the Drogheda Paddle Steamship Co. It provided shipping services between Drogheda and Liverpool from 1825 to 1902, in which year it was taken over by the Lancashire and Yorkshire Railway.

History

The company was founded in July 1825 with the issue of 300 shares at £50 each. It was founded as the Drogheda Paddle Steamship Co.

The board of directors included Robert Pentland, mayor of Drogheda, John Leslie Foster, the MP for County Louth, Blayney T. Balfour, St. George Smith, James McCann, Patrick Ternan, Nathaniel Hill, Patrick Boylan, John Woolsey and William Rodger.

On 13 November 1826, PS Town of Drogheda arrived from Scotland.  She made her maiden voyage to Liverpool on 26 November in 14 hours. Until 1829 a weekly service was operated sailing from Drogheda on Fridays and returning on Tuesdays under its master, Captain M. Ownes. She was employed until 1846, when she was sold.

In 1829, the company temporarily chartered the PS Liffey and PS Mersey from the City of Dublin Steam Packet Company to increase the sailings to three per week. These were sent back when the new ship, PS Fair Trader was delivered at the end of the year.

Further expansion in the 1830s saw the arrival of PS Green Isle the PS Irishman and PS Grainne Ueile.

PS Faugh-a-Ballagh was acquired in 1844, the first iron-hulled vessel. This was followed by PS Brian Boroimhe and PS St. Patrick in 1846.

Closure

In 1902 the assets of the company were taken over by the Lancashire and Yorkshire Railway for the sum of £80,000 (equivalent to £ in ),

House flag

House Flag as seen in the 1882 edition of the Lloyd's Codes Of Distinguishing Flags Of The Steamship Owners Of the United Kingdom. Another version shows a larger Arc.

Vessels

References

Drogheda
1825 establishments in Ireland
Transport companies disestablished in 1902
Shipping companies of Ireland
Packet (sea transport)
Transport in Drogheda
Transport companies established in 1825
1902 disestablishments in Ireland